E81 may refer to:
 European route E81
 King's Indian Defence, Encyclopaedia of Chess Openings code
 Nikkō Utsunomiya Road, route E81 in Japan